The Orthodox Scout Association was founded in 1968. As of 2011, the Orthodox Scouts maintain a membership of approximately 2,500, ages 7 to 18. They are aligned to the Arab and Druze Scouts Movement. The emblem features the wreath from the flag of the United Nations.

See also
 Arab Orthodox Society
 Arab and Druze Scouts Movement
 Palestinian Scout Association

References

External links 
Christian Orthodox Scout Association
Facebook
Orthodox scout Jerusalem 2016 palm Sunday
Arab orthodox scout Jerusalem holy fire 2015
Coptic Scouts
Palestinian scouting pipers promote harmony in Jerusalem
Palestinian Scouts march in celebration of Orthodox Easter

Scouting and Guiding in Israel
World Association of Girl Guides and Girl Scouts member organizations
World Organization of the Scout Movement member organizations
Eastern Orthodox organizations
1968 establishments in Israel